Gordon Woolmer (24 February 1917 – 31 July 1999) was an Australian cricketer. He played one first-class matches for New South Wales in 1945/46.

See also
 List of New South Wales representative cricketers

References

External links
 

1917 births
1999 deaths
Australian cricketers
New South Wales cricketers
Cricketers from Newcastle, New South Wales